Masami Kubota (born 6 December 1931) is a Japanese former gymnast who competed in the 1956 Summer Olympics.

References

External links

1931 births
Possibly living people
Japanese male artistic gymnasts
Olympic gymnasts of Japan
Gymnasts at the 1956 Summer Olympics
Olympic silver medalists for Japan
Olympic bronze medalists for Japan
Olympic medalists in gymnastics
Medalists at the 1956 Summer Olympics
20th-century Japanese people